SS San Wilfrido was the name of two British merchant ships:
, launched in 1914 for the Eagle Oil Transport Company 
, launched in 1942 as SS Empire Cobbett. Purchased in 1946 by the Eagle Oil and Shipping Company and renamed.

Ship names